Ingram Wilcox is a British quizzer, who became the fifth person to win the £1,000,000 prize on Who Wants to Be a Millionaire? in the UK, and the fifth legitimate contestant to do so.

Quiz Appearances

Mastermind 
In 1980, Wilcox reached the final of Mastermind, but came third  (out of four) with 27 points, beaten by Fred Housego who won with 33 points. Wilcox's specialist subject was "The Crusades 1095–1192" in both his heat and the final, while in the semi-final he chose "Mammals".

Fifteen to One 
Wilcox appeared on Fifteen to One in both 1995 and 1996, including two grand finals, and was a witness to an outtake where host William G. Stewart dropped his question cards whilst explaining the rules of the first round in 1995.

Who Wants to Be A Millionaire? 

In two appearances of Who Wants to Be a Millionaire? (broadcast on 5 June 2004 and 11 June 2005) Wilcox reached the "Fastest Finger First" stage but did not progress any further.

On 23 September 2006, Wilcox became the fifth person to win the £1,000,000 jackpot on the show. When he reached the one million pound question, despite using all of his lifelines by the £32,000 question. His final question was "Which boxer was famous for striking the gong in the introduction to J. Arthur Rank films?" He correctly chose Bombardier Billy Wells to win the prize money.

Personal life 
Wilcox grew up in London, but lived in Bath for 30 years. He is a father of five and has worked in the civil service for most of his life, having previously worked in illustration of educational books. He is the son of the painter Leslie Arthur Wilcox and brother of photographer William Wilcox.

In 2007, Wilcox moved to the South of France where he currently resides with his wife.

Other quiz appearances

 Countdown, four times in 1983 and Countdown Masters in 1990
 Two Fifteen to One grand finals in 1995
 The runner-up on Brain of Britain in 1978 and 1996
 Masterbrain in 1996 
Won three episodes of Top of the World in 1982
 Who Wants to Be a Millionaire? winner in 2006

References 

Living people
Contestants on British game shows
1944 births